Prior to 1956 the Sri Lankan armed forces received honours of the United Kingdom, including military decorations and campaign medals. Since 1981, Sri Lanka has introduced its own honours system. This has resulted in a new system of Sri Lankan honours, military and police awards, and campaign medals.

19th century

 Capture of Ceylon Medal 
 Ceylon Medal

South African War

 Queen's South Africa Medal
 King's South Africa Medal

World War I

 1914 Star
 1914–15 Star
 British War Medal
 Victory Medal

World War II

 1939–1945 Star
 Air Crew Europe Star
 Africa Star
 Burma Star
 Italy Star
 France and Germany Star
 Defence Medal
 War Medal 1939–1945

Post World War II

 General Service Medal 1918–62 (Malaya clasp)
 Purna Bhumi Padakkama
 North and East Operations Medal 
 Vadamarachchi Operation Medal 
 Riviresa Campaign Services Medal
 Eastern Humanitarian Operations Medal
 Northern Humanitarian Operations Medal

See also

Military awards and decorations of Sri Lanka
Orders, decorations, and medals of Sri Lanka

References

Sri Lanka and the Commonwealth of Nations